Bartholomeus Amicus (born in Anzi, Basilicata; 1562–1649), or Bartolomeo Amico or Bartholomeo d'Amici, was a Jesuit priest, teacher and writer who spent his adult life in Naples. The subjects he wrote about include Aristotelian philosophy, mathematics, astronomy, and the concept of vacuum and its relationship with God.

He studied law before joining the Jesuits and following the curriculum in their college in Naples, later teaching logic, physics, metaphysics and theology. In his extensive writing he presented alternative theories, including those of Christopher Clavius and Copernicus, even when he disagreed with them, though theologians of that period did not always explain opposing views. He sought to establish workable science without undermining theology.

See also
 List of Roman Catholic scientist-clerics

References
Scholasticon by Jacob Schmutz
Edward Grant, Much Ado about Nothing : Theories of Space and Vacuum from the Middle Ages to the Scientific Revolution (1981) - Chapter 7

Bibliografia 
 Carlo Caterini, Gens Catherina de terra Balii, Rende, Edizioni Scientifiche Calabresi, 2009.

1562 births
1649 deaths
17th-century Italian Jesuits
Catholic clergy scientists
Jesuit scientists
Clergy from Naples